AFL Sydney is an Australian rules football League, based in metropolitan Sydney, Australia. The AFL Sydney competition comprises 126 teams from 22 clubs which play across seven senior men's divisions, five women's divisions, a Master's Division and two under 19 competitions in season 2022.

History
The Sydney AFL began as the NSW Australian Football Association in 1903. In 1980 it became known as the "Sydney Football League". It was renamed the "Sydney AFL" in 1998 before a new name change for season 2009, "AFL Sydney".

11 clubs contested the opening season in 1903, with East Sydney taking out the first premiership with a 6-point win over North Shore. 100 years later, similar to the repeated result of the centenary cricket Test in 1977; in the centenary season in 2003, East Sydney (by now known as UNSW-Eastern Suburbs) again defeated North Shore by 6 points.

Over the years many clubs have come and gone, with the turnover of teams continuing to the present day. By 1998 the league consisted of 7 teams – Balmain, Pennant Hills, North Shore, St George, East Sydney, Western Suburbs and Baulkham Hills.

1999
In 1999, Campbelltown returned to the Sydney AFL after a 3-year stint in AFL Canberra. The Blues, as they were then known, were an exceptionally strong club at the time and dominated the league in their first year back in Sydney. In the grand final, Campbelltown 18.5 (113) were far too good for Balmain 13.13 (91) to take out the premiership by 22 points.

2000
In 2000, after the AFL's reserve grade competition was abolished, the Swans fielded a team in the Sydney AFL, known as the Redbacks. This move didn't turn out to be successful, with the existing clubs unable to compete against full-time professional footballers who had far superior training resources. The games were generally one-sided, to the point where the rules were changed halfway through the season to allow other clubs to field an extra player against the Redbacks. The Redbacks finished top of the ladder, but elected not to compete in the finals; and in their absence Pennant Hills took out their first premiership with a 15.12 (102) to 12.7 (79) win over North Shore in the grand final.
During the 2000 season, several Sydney AFL clubs had formed strategic alliances with clubs in the AFL. As part of this, some Sydney AFL clubs were to change their identity over the next few years. North Shore had always been black and red but took on the Bombers nickname of Essendon. St George renamed themselves the St George Crows and began wearing the navy, gold and blue strip of Adelaide. But the biggest change in identity was Baulkham Hills, who changed their colours to blue and gold and took on the new name of the East Coast Eagles. Other clubs were to follow suit. Another change in 2000 was the merger of traditional powerhouse East Sydney with the University of NSW club to form the UNSW-Eastern Suburbs Bulldogs.

2001
In 2001, with the Redbacks concept having not been considered a success, the Swans entered an alliance with Port Melbourne in the VFL and fielded their reserves with Port Melbourne. They continued to field a Redbacks team for the next 2 years, mainly as a junior development and talent-spotting team; but the Redbacks were never to make the top 4 again. Instead it was North Shore who led from start to finish in 2001, and although the grand final was tight the Bombers got critical goals when it mattered to record a 12.12 (84) to 10.9 (69) victory over Campbelltown.

2002
2002 saw a resurgent Uni NSW-Eastern Suburbs team return to the top, and despite a strong challenge from North Shore the Bulldogs finished the season as minor premiers. But the Bulldogs would have to go the long way into the grand final after North Shore came from behind to beat them by 3 points in the major semi-final. But UNSW-ES bounced back to win the preliminary final and earn a grand final berth, something that no major-final loser has managed to do in the 4 years since.
On grand final day, despite the bright sunshine and perfect conditions, no side was able to score for the first 17 minutes as the defences of both teams held tight. But eventually it was to be North Shore that cracked, and although they fought back in the third term to come into the last break only a few points behind, they never led. Instead, it was UNSW-ES who ran away with the game in the last quarter to record a 16.10 (106) to 11.6 (72) win and their first premiership since the merger. This was the last grand final to be played at Macquarie University.

2003
The Redbacks finally withdrew from the Sydney AFL in 2003 and the competition was reduced to 8 teams. North Shore got the season off to a flying start and were undefeated for the first 14 rounds, the Bombers losing only 2 home & away games all season. Campbelltown returned to form early in the season, but after being badly beaten by North Shore at Gore Hill in round 7 they fell away and only just scraped into the finals and have yet to make the finals since. Instead it was St George that came in 2nd, with reigning premiers UNSW-ES coming third.
North Shore qualified first for the grand final, while UNSW-ES eliminated Campbelltown. In the prelim final, St George were held goal-less in the second half and for the 4th year in a row had been defeated in the prelim final. And so the grand final in the league's centenary year, which was played at Monarch Oval in Campbelltown, would involve the same teams that played in the first grand final.
And the result was to repeat. North Shore went in as the hottest of favourites, but poor kicking and excellent pressure from the Bulldogs saw them pull off a stunning upset. UNSW-ES 12.10 (82) defeated North Shore 10.16 (76), an exact repeat of the very first Sydney AFL grand final.

2004
In 2004, the Sydney AFL adopted Henson Park as its finals venue. In later years, the Marrickville ground which also hosts the Newtown Jets in the NSW Rugby League would play a bigger role in Sydney football and be the venue for representative fixtures and night matches.
North Shore were again front-runners, remaining undefeated until the second half of the season and again losing only 2 home & away games. Tennis ace Patrick Rafter played a few reserve grade games for the Bombers during this season but was never picked in the senior team.
North Shore finished top after the home & away season, with UNSW-ES finishing 2nd. But this time the Bulldogs were to miss out on a grand final berth and instead St George finally broke through the preliminary final hurdle to qualify for the big day.
Having lost the previous 2 grand finals the Bombers were nervous, and even more so when St George led by 4 points at half time. But the Bombers pulled away with the wind in the third term and the Crows were unable to respond when they had the win in the last quarter. So it was North Shore who took out the premiership, with a 10.11 (71) to 7.4 (46) victory.

2005
In 2005, the Wollongong Lions were admitted to Premier Division, creating a 9-team league. The Lions are well-run off the field, and proved competitive on it. Western Suburbs and Pennant Hills were the leaders for much of the season, Wests remaining undefeated until round 9 and Pennant Hills until round 10. The round 9 loss was to be Wests' only loss in the home & away season. Pennant Hills lost much of their edge after captain Barnaby Howarth suffered a stroke after training and was unable to play again, but bounced back to finish 2nd after the home & away season.
Wests and Pennant Hills were a long way in front of other teams and were widely fancied to play in the grand final. Wests made it through in the major semi-final, but in a stunning upset Pennant Hills went down in the preliminary final to reigning premiers North Shore. The Bombers were to turn on an even more stunning upset in the grand final, getting on top after half-time to record a 13.9 (87) to 6.10 (46) win over Wests and take out back-to-back flags.
Premier Reserves: UNSW-ES def East Coast Eagles
1st Division Seniors: Sydney Uni Students def UTS Bats
1st Division Reserves: Sydney Uni Students def UTS Bats
2nd Division: Nor-West Jets 10.10 (70) def Sydney Uni Blue 4.11 (34)

2006

Before the 2006 season, East Coast Eagles recruited heavily in a bid to get to the top. The Eagles had been close to the finals for years without making it into the top 4, but this was to change in 2006 and the Eagles took all before them in an undefeated home & away season. Sydney's drought had a major bearing on this season, with several grounds being hardened dustbowls and the turf on many grounds going out of shape; so that even small amounts of rain caused puddles to form and the grounds to be closed. All clubs faced rising injury tolls due to the ground conditions.
After an undefeated home & away season and an easy win in the major semi-final, East Coast Eagles went into the grand final at Henson Park against Pennant Hills as the hottest of favourites. But this was the day the drought was to break, with conditions more resembling water polo than football. The Eagles' running game was negated by the conditions and by Pennant Hills' pressure tactice, while the Demons' tactic of peppering the goals from a distance and keeping the scoreboard paid dividends. Although the Eagles scored 2 more goals, the constant scoring got Pennant Hills over the line, 5.20 (50) to 7.6 (48). There have been many upsets in recent years in Sydney AFL grand finals, but this one more so than any of the others.
Premier Reserves: East Coast Eagles def Pennant Hills
1st Division Seniors: UTS Bats def Sydney Uni Students
1st Division Reserves: UTS Bats def Sydney Uni Students
2nd Division: Nor-West Jets 8.9.(57) def UNSW/ES Bulldogs 6.5 (41)

2007
In 2007, Sydney University was re-admitted to Premier Division, making a 10-team competition. 18 home & away rounds were played, with each team playing each other twice; although the first match between North Shore and Balmain was postponed twice, leading to the two clubs playing each other twice within 4 days.
Reigning premiers Pennant Hills finished top of the ladder, and were joined in the finals by St George, North Shore and Campbelltown. But the Demons were upset in the major semi-final after St George got off to a flying start and maintained their lead to qualify first for the grand final. Campbelltown made the finals for the first time since 2003, but were no match for North Shore in the minor semi. North Shore maintained their winning form in the prelim final, comfortably accounting for Pennant Hills – the 5th year in a row the loser of the major semi has again lost in the prelim final.
Grand final day was fine and warm, and in ideal conditions at Henson Park North Shore led by 15 points at half-time and extended the lead in the third term. But a determined charge by St George closed the gap to just 4 points at three-quarter time. The Crows looked to have the momentum, but North Shore steadied to score the only two goals in the last quarter and record a 12.15 (87) to 9.12 (66) victory. Ryan Davis was awarded the Podbury Medal for best on ground in the grand final.
Premier Reserves: East Coast Eagles 11.7 (73) def Pennant Hills 10.12 (72)
1st Division Seniors: Manly-Warringah Wolves 10.14 (74) def Southern Sharks 9.9 (63)
1st Division Reserves: UTS Bats 9.10 (64) def Manly Warringah Wolves 5.4 (34)
2nd Division: Pennant Hills 10.4 (64) def UNSW/ES Bulldogs 6.4 (40)

2008
2008 commenced with a marathon day at Henson Park, in which all five Premier Division Seniors matches for round 1 were played back to back.
Bad weather and construction delays meant that East Coast Eagles were unable to move into their new home ground at Bruce Purser Reserve in 2008, but the Eagles put those frustrations behind them to qualify for the finals. Also returning to finals action in 2008 after missing out in 2007 was UNSW-ES, who finished top of the ladder after the home & away season.
A five-team finals series was re-introduced for 2008; and reigning premiers North Shore bounced back from a slow start to the season to qualify for the finals. But the Bombers were to go no further than the first week of the finals. Also qualifying for the playoffs were Pennant Hills and St George.
East Coast finished 4th after the home & away series, but won three finals matches to qualify for the grand final. Their opponent in the grand final was Pennant Hills. All finals matches were again played at Henson Park except for the second semi-final which was played in wet conditions at North Dalton Park
The grand final was played in 33-degree heat, the hottest grand final day in the history of the Sydney AFL competition. After a tight and low-scoring first half, Pennant Hills took complete control after half-time to cruise to a comprehensive 105-point victory. Pennant Hills' Scott Reed was awarded the Podbury Medal as best on ground, and will join Collingwood's rookie list for 2009.

Premier Division Seniors Pennant Hills 20.13 (133) def East Coast Eagles 3.10 (28)
Premier Division Reserves East Coast Eagles 12.15 (87) def Sydney University 2.5 (17)
U18s Premier Cup North Shore Bombers 15.11 (101) def East Coast Eagles 8.11 (59)
1st Division Seniors UTS Bats 13.16 (94) def. Manly-Warringah Wolves 11.12 (78)
1st Division Reserves UTS Bats 17.12 (114) def. Manly-Warringah Wolves 10.2 (62)
U18s Challenge Cup UNSW/Eastern Suburbs Bulldogs 23.18 (156) def. Southern Sharks 4.5 (29)
2nd Division Pennant Hills Demons 18.10 (118) def. Sydney Uni Blue Students 13.5 (83)

2009
2009 saw the introduction of a Divisional structure, with promotion and relegation through the lower divisions (see the Divisional Structure section further down this page).
2009 was also notable for the opening of two new football venues in Sydney. Bruce Purser Reserve was opened in February when it hosted an AFL trial match between the Sydney Swans and the Western Bulldogs, and through the course of the year served as the home ground for East Coast Eagles; as well as a backup venue for wet weather, with Pennant Hills, Western Suburbs and North Shore also playing home games at the venue. The Second Semi-Final was also played there.
And later in the season, Blacktown Olympic Park began operations, firstly as the venue for the Representative fixture where Sydney AFL defeated AFL Canberra. In August the ground held a spectacular opening ceremony, with fireworks and Aboriginal dance as well as a match between Western Suburbs and Pennant Hills. The venue was then the host for all the finals except for the Second Semi Final.
On the field, St George returned to tradition; going back to their traditional red and white colours and the Dragons name, but it was to be a tough year on the field as they missed the finals for the second time this decade. Also missing out on finals action for the second time since the turn of the millennium was North Shore.
East Coast Eagles, strengthened by finally having a home ground to call their own, took out the minor premiership and were first to qualify for the Grand Final after a comfortable win over Wests in the Second Semi Final, a match where East Coast's full forward Gus Seebeck kicked his 100th goal for the season.
Campbelltown returned to finals action after missing out in 2008, but were eliminated in the first week of finals action. Week 2 saw the demise of reigning premier Pennant Hills; while the Preliminary Final saw UNSW-ES qualify for the Grand Final at the expense of Wests.
The Grand Final was played in perfect weather, but was to be a one-sided contest. East Coast took control of the game early and won every quarter to record a comfortable 54-point win. Gus Seebeck kicked 10 goals for the Eagles to win the Podbury Medal.

Premier Division – East Coast Eagles 22.12 (144) d UNSW-ES 13.12 (90)
First Division – UTS 21.10 (136) d East Coast Eagles 5.7 (37)
Second Division – Macquarie Uni 11.15 (81) d UTS 8.5 (53)
Third Division – UNSW-ES 9.4 (58) d UTS 6.12 (48)
Fourth Division – Sydney Uni 16.6 (102) d UNSW-ES 8.8 (56)
Under 18s Premier – North Shore 8.9 (57) d St George 6.9 (45)
Under 18s Challenge – Sydney Uni 16.14 (110) d Southern Power 2.5 (17)

2010
Sydney Uni, on the back of a 14-game winning streak, were minor premiers. Also finishing in the final five were Wests, East Coast, North Shore and Pennant Hills.

East Coast Eagles win back to back premierships, defeating Sydney University in the Grand Final (13.9-87)(10.10-70).

UTSAFC are admitted to Premier Division.

2011
UTSAFC finished 10th in their first year in the Premier Division winning 3 games. Campbelltown finished last, failing to win a game.

The East Coast Eagles won the minor premiership, joining them in the finals were Balmain, Sydney University, North Shore and Pennant Hills.

Results in the 2011 Finals Series:
Qualifying Final: Balmain 14.8 (92) defeated Sydney University 10.12 (72)
Elimination Final: North Shore 17.10 (112) defeated Pennant Hills 8.8 (56)
Major Semi Final: East Coast 11.12 (78) defeated Balmain 7.18 (60)
Minor Semi Final: Sydney University 24.11 (155) defeated North Shore 10.4 (64)
Preliminary Final: Balmain 13.7 (85) defeated Sydney University 12.10 (82)

Grand Final: East Coast 17.12 (114) defeated Balmain 10.11 (71)

2012
The same eleven teams competed in Premier Division in 2012, but with East Coast Eagles (now renamed Sydney Hills Eagles) and Sydney Uni joining the NEAFL, the Premier Division teams for those two clubs were their reserves teams. Neither made the finals, and the Eagles' run of premierships ended after their three-peat from 2009 to 2011.
UNSW-ES were the form team of the 2012 season, spearheaded by a Phelan Medal performance from Dane Rampe that would result in him being drafted by the Swans. UNSW-ES finished top of the ladder, and would meet Balmain in the Grand Final. Pennant Hills, North Shore and St George completed the top five.
The grand final was played as a twilight match at Blacktown International Sportspark. The lead see-sawed for three-quarters, with the Bulldogs leading by four points at the last change. But a run of seven goals to one in the final term saw the Bulldogs run our comfortable 42-point winners; their first premiership since 2003 and condemning Balmain to their second straight grand final defeat.

Premier Division - UNSW-ES 13.11 (89) d Balmain 7.5 (47)
Division One - Manly 11.15 (81) d Southern Power 9.2 (56)
Division Two - St George 7.8 (50) d UNSW-ES 6.10 (46)
Division Three - UTS 15.4 (94) d Blacktown 8.5 (53)
Division Four - Penrith 9.16 (70) d Gosford 8.6 (54)
Division Five - Sydney Uni 10.6 (66) d UTS 9.7 (61)
Under 18s One - Sydney Hills Eagles 14.14 (98) d Illawarra 11.10 (76)
Under 18s Two - Southern Power 9.11 (65) d Manly 3.4 (22)
Women - Balmain 7.9 (51) d Sydney Uni 2.1 (13)

2013
The 2013 season saw Manly added to Premier Division, making a 12-team competition. This resulted in six games per round in an 18-round home and away season, with not all teams playing each other twice.
Manly, the newcomers to the top division, would make an immediate impact as they won their first nine games in Premier Division; shooting straight to the top of the ladder on their way to the minor premiership.
Sydney Uni and Sydney Hills Eagles fielded teams in the NEAFL in 2013; with their Premier Division teams being the clubs' reserves teams. Neither qualified for the finals in Premier Division; with the Eagles finishing on the bottom of the ladder.
The season was a fall from grace for Balmain. The Dockers, after playing in the last two Grand Finals, crashed down the ladder in 2013; and internal tensions boiled over late in the season as 11 players staged a walk-out after five minutes, causing the club to forfeit a Premier Division clash against Wests.
The walk-out was to be the end of Balmain in Premier Division, as AFL Sydney relegated them to Division One for 2014. Also playing their last season in Premier Division this year was Illawarra, after nine years in the top division without a finals appearance and winning only one game this season.
This season would also be the last for Auburn Tigers as a men's club, after forfeiting several games in Division Two. However, Auburn would continue as a women's club until 2018.
Manly finished the regular season as minor premiers, and defeated St George in the Major Semi-Final to be first team through to the Grand Final. Their opponents in the Grand Final would be Pennant Hills, who finished fourth in the regular season but defeated UNSW-ES, North Shore and St George in the finals to make their way through.
The Demons led by eight points at the long break, but the Wolves made the decisive move in the premiership quarter with three goals to one to turn the half time deficit into a six-point lead at three quarter time. The Demons hit the lead early in the last, but the Wolves regained the momentum to regain the lead and take out the Grand Final by eight points; a remarkable achievement in their first season at the top level.

Grand Final winners 2013:
Premier Division – Manly 11.14 (80) def Pennant Hills 11.6 (72)
Division One – Southern Power 16.9 (105) def UNSW-ES 3.2 (20)
Division Two – Sydney Uni 8.14 (62) def Manly 7.6 (48)
Division Three – Blacktown 11.11 (77) def Randwick City 10.6 (66)
Division Four – Pennant Hills 14.11 (95) def Sydney Uni 4.4 (28)
Division Five – Randwick City 13.8 (86) def UTS 6.7 (43)
Under 19s Division One – Pennant Hills 10.10 (70) def UNSW-ES 10.7 (67)
Under 19s Division Two – Manly 20.24 (144) def Holroyd-Parramatta 3.5 (23)
Women's Division One – Sydney Uni 7.9 (51) def Balmain 3.7 (25)
Women's Division Two – Macquarie Uni 7.11 (53) def Southern Power 4.1 (25)

2018
In season 2018 the Camden Cats were promoted to the Men's Premier Division to again bring the number of clubs in Sydney's top flight back to 10 after Campbelltown Blues withdrew at the conclusion of the 2014 season. AFL Sydney continues to grow with thirteen Divisions across men's, women's, U19s and Masters Football.

2019 
The 2019 season saw an extra Women's division created to accommodate the rapid grown of Women's football in Sydney. In this division, the St George Dragons finished in 5th place but 4 sudden-death finals win in a row saw them defeat minor premiers, Holroyd-Parramatta Goannas in the Grand Final. Similarly, the St George Dragons Premier Division Reserves team also came from 5th to defeat Minor Premiers, the Pennant Hills Australian Demons. In the Premier Division competition the UNSW-Eastern Suburbs Bulldogs went back-to-back by defeating Sydney University. Macquarie University defeated East Coast Eagles by 6 points to win the Women's Premier Division Grand Final. This season saw the Western Suburbs Magpies change their name to Inner West Magpies to further distinguish between themselves and the South West Sydney Magpies (formerly Moorebank).

2020 
The 2020 season was severely disrupted by the COVID-19 pandemic and due to the NSW Government's restrictions only 9 Home and Away rounds were able to be played before the finals. The finals were played in September–October rather than the traditional August–September. Sydney University won their first Premier Division flag since 1992 with a win over UNSW-Eastern Suburbs Bulldogs at Kanebridge Oval. Manly-Warringah, in their first season in the Women's Premier Division Premiership won the flag by defeating the Inner West Magpies. Southern Power made both the Platinum Division and Platinum Division Reserves Grand Finals at Rosedale Oval but lost to the Penrith Rams and Macquarie University (in a come-from-behind win) respectively. The Newtown Breakways inaugural men's team won the Men's Division 3 Grand Final by defeating North Shore. Grand Finals were played at Rosedale Ovals (for lower grades) and Kanebridge Oval due to the unavailability of Blacktown International Sportspark due to the COVID-19 pandemic. This was also the reason there was no Master's Grand Final in 2020.

2021 
The 2021 season saw the introduction of a 5th Division of Women's Football known as "Women's Division 4". 7 teams took part in this new division. There was also an additional 12 teams across all Men's and Women's divisions. On the 24th of June, the season was put on hold due to the outbreak COVID-19 Delta variant throughout Greater Sydney.  The 2021 season was eventually cancelled on the 16th of August. Accordingly, no premierships, medals or awards were given for 2021 cancelled competitions.

2022 
The 2022 season saw a slight reduction in overall teams from 135 to 126. This season also saw the merger of South West Sydney Magpies and Campbelltown Blues to form the South Western Sydney Blues. This proved to be a successful season for the merged entity as they went on to win the Platinum Division Premiership and finish Runners-Up in the Platinum Division Reserves Competition. This wasn't the first time that the clubs had aligned, with the two clubs previously entering a combined U19s side in the Division 2 competition. Other club changes were Nor-West Jets being renamed to Hawkesbury Jets and the North West Sydney Redbacks no longer entering a team in the Masters competition.

Audience 
Attendances for the Sydney AFL are very small in comparison to state level leagues elsewhere in Australia, however Grand Final crowds sometimes reach as high as 3,000 though historically they were much higher towards 15,000 .

In 2007, in a first for Australian rules football in Sydney, it was announced that Foxtel would be televising an edited match of the week and a magazine-style segment on the Aurora Community Television Channel. The program contained footy news from around NSW/ACT as well as showing highlights from the "Match of the Week". In 2008 the magazine style was dropped in favour of a 1-hour dedicated highlights show of the Match of the Week. Digital Sports Productions continued this format in 2009 and the show is aired on the Main Event Channel each Friday night in NSW and QLD before the AFL Friday night game.

2021 also saw the introduction of a Men's and Women's Premier Division Women's "Match of the Round" being live-streamed on Kayo Sports which could be watched for free.

Clubs

Current Clubs

Location of Current Clubs

Uniforms

Men's Premier Division

Men's Platinum Division

Other Divisions

Former Clubs

2022 Men's Divisions

2022 Women's Divisions

First Grade (Men's) Premiers
List of First Grade Men's (currently Premier Division) premiers.

Number of Premierships by Club

First Grade (Women's) Premiers 
List of First Grade Women's (currently Women's Premier Division) premiers.

Number of Premierships by Club

Best and fairest awards
The Phelan Medal is an annual award given in the Sydney AFL. It is awarded to best and fairest player of the premier division competition each year. It is seen to be the AFL Sydney equivalent to the Brownlow Medal.  The Mostyn Medal is awarded to the best and fairest player in the premier division of the women's league.

References

External links
 

Australian rules football competitions in New South Wales
Sports competitions in Sydney
1903 establishments in Australia
Sports leagues established in 1903
Professional sports leagues in Australia